Jasmina Jankovic (born 6 December 1986) is a Dutch handball player of Bosnian origin, who played for the Dutch national team.

She represented the Netherlands at the 2013 World Women's Handball Championship in Serbia. In 2016 she represented the Netherlands at the 2016 Olympics in Rio de Janeiro

References

External links
 

Dutch female handball players
1986 births
Living people
Bosnia and Herzegovina emigrants to the Netherlands
Dutch handball coaches
People from Doboj
Expatriate handball players
Handball players at the 2016 Summer Olympics
Olympic handball players of the Netherlands
21st-century Dutch women